The Barbados Transport Board is the government owned bus transport provider in the country of Barbados. The headquarters is located at Weymouth, Roebuck Street, while the main terminal is at Fairchild Street in Saint Michael. The other three terminals are: the Constitution River Terminal (located just across the river from the Main Terminal, The Princess Alice Terminal also in Bridgetown, Saint Michael and the Speightstown Terminal in Speightstown, Saint Peter in the north. Also, the three bus depots are located at Weymouth, Saint Michael, Oistins, Christ Church and Mangrove, Saint Philip.

The Barbados Transport Board now has a fleet of approximately 340 buses (nine buses which were destroyed by fire - BM 53, BM 55, BM 113, BM 117, BM 213, BM 232, BM 251, BM 256 and BM 530). The buses are blue in colour with a yellow trim and white top.  The buses had drivers and conductors to collect fares, but now have automatic fare collection machines since the 1990s. The new Wayfarer bus ticket system was introduced in April, 2005 for all Transport Board buses.  The Transport Board also compete with the privately owned white and maroon stripe coloured route taxis (called ZRs) and the yellow and blue stripe coloured mini-buses.  The Barbados Transport Board was approved in June, 1955 by draft legislation of the Governor of Barbados.  Three months later, an act of Parliament was passed on 24 August 1955, establishing the Transport Board. The Transport Board's fleet of buses that they had purchased were; 20 Hino small buses and 40 Mercedes-Benz (OH1621) Marcopolo Torino GV buses in November, 1996 and Mercedes-Benz (OH1622) Alpha Caio large buses in November, 1997 respectively; 15 Hino smaller buses, 50 Mercedes-Benz (OH1420) Marcopolo Torino and 45 Mercedes-Benz (OH1821) Busscar Urbanuss large buses and air-conditioned large buses in November, 1999, respectively when the air-conditioned units were taken off in late September, 2006; 25 Mercedes-Benz (OH1420) Marcopolo Torino large buses in November, 2003; 5 Mercedes-Benz (LO915) Marcopolo Senior Marksell smaller buses in November, 2004; and 65 Mercedes-Benz (T270R) Allison Transmission Marcopolo Torino large buses in November, 2006. As the Transport Board goes further with the future of cleaner, greener transportation, the new 33 BYD K8RA electric buses had shipped to Barbados from China in just a matter of weeks until 8 July 2020. The 33 electric buses left the Bridgetown Port on 10 July 2020; 5 for the Speightstown Bus Terminal; 10 for the Mangrove Bus Depot; and 18 for the Weymouth Bus Depot. There will soon be the new 250 BYD K8RA battery-powered electric low-floor buses and 450 Yutong ZK6120CHEVPG21 battery-recharged electric-powered hybrid low-floor buses here in Barbados from mid-2021 onwards post COVID-19.

Here is the list of current bus routes being operated by the Barbados Transport Board.

From Princess Alice, Fairchild Street and Speightstown Bus Terminals, Oistins Bus Sub-terminal and the Cross-Country Routes

1 Speightstown

1A Boscobelle

1A1 Indian Ground

1AA Indian Ground/Boscobelle

1B Pie Corner

1C Connelltown

1C1 Josey Hill

1CB Josey Hill/Pie Corner

1D District D

1E Bathsheba

1F St. Lucy's Church

1G St. Albans

1H Holetown

1P Porters/Westmoreland

1S Speightstown

2 Rock Hall

2A Rock Dundo

3 St. Andrew's Church

3A White Hill

4 Shorey Village

4A Sturges

5 Chalky Mount

5A Airy Hill

5C Chalky Mount

5S Sugar Hill

6 Bathsheba

6A Martin's Bay

6C Chalky Mount

6E Market Hill

7 Sargeant Street

7A Bowmanston

7B Bath

8B Workmans

8D Drax Hall

8F Flat Rock

9 College Savannah

9A Society

9C Church Village

10 Bayfield

10A Wellhouse

10S Six Roads

11 Marley Vale

11A Edey Village

11T TASI Edey Village

12 Sam Lord's Castle

12A Kirtons/Crane

12F Fairy Valley

12P Airport

13A St. Christopher/Silver Sands

16 St. Patricks

16A Lowlands

16S Silver Hill

19 Yorkshire

19C Edey Village/Yorkshire

19D Dash Valley

19K Kendal

20 Howells/Ivy

22A Eden Lodge

23 Holders Hill

24 Wanstead

25 Deacons Road

25A Cave Hill/Grazettes

26 College Savannah

27 Oistins

27D Sam Lord's Castle

27E Oistins

28 Oistins

29 Rock Hall

30 Silver Sands

30M Oistins via Melrose

31 Silver Sands

31A Silver Sands

32 Silver Sands

33 City Circle

34 Southern Circle

35 Silver Sands (new cross-country route coming soon)

36 Kirtons via Oistins/Airport

37 Silver Sands via Airport

40 St. Lucy's Church

41 Boscobelle

42 Indian Ground

43 St. Clements (new route coming soon)

44 Pie Corner

50 Warrens/Jackson via Spring Garden

51 Bridgetown Shuttle

54 Speightstown via ABC Highway

54C Speightstown via Coverley

55 Warrens via Six Roads

56 University Hill/Holetown via Kingsland/Warrens

57 Warrens via Garrison/Bank Hall/Tudor Bridge

58 Warrens via St. George Church

59 Warrens via Holetown

60 Oistins via Green Hill

To Princess Alice, Fairchild Street and Speightstown Bus Terminals, Oistins Bus Sub-terminal and Cross-Country Routes

1 Bridgetown

1A Bridgetown

1A1 Bridgetown

1B Bridgetown

1C Bridgetown

1C1 Bridgetown

1CB Bridgetown

1D Bridgetown

1E Speightstown

1F Bridgetown

1G Bridgetown

1H Bridgetown

1P Bridgetown

1S Bridgetown

2 Bridgetown

2A Bridgetown

3 Bridgetown

3A Bridgetown

4 Bridgetown

4A Bridgetown

5 Bridgetown

5A Bridgetown

5C Bridgetown

5S Bridgetown

6 Bridgetown

6A Bridgetown

6C Bridgetown

6E Bridgetown

7 Bridgetown

7A Bridgetown

7B Bridgetown

8AB Bridgetown

8B Bridgetown

8D Bridgetown

8F Bridgetown

9 Bridgetown

9A Bridgetown

9C Bridgetown

10 Bridgetown

10A Bridgetown

10S Bridgetown

11 Bridgetown

11A Bridgetown

11T Bridgetown

12 Bridgetown

12A Bridgetown

12F Bridgetown

13A Bridgetown

16 Bridgetown

16A Bridgetown

16S Bridgetown

19 Bridgetown

19C Bridgetown

19D Bridgetown

19K Bridgetown

20 Bridgetown

22A Bridgetown

23 Bridgetown

24 Bridgetown

25 Bridgetown

25A Bridgetown

26 Oistins

27 Speightstown

27E Wanstead

28 St. George Church

29 Speightstown

30 Rock Dundo

31 Rock Hall

31A St. Judes

32 White Hill

33 City Circle

34 Southern Circle

35 Church Village (new cross-country route coming soon)

35A Speightstown

36 Speightstown

37 Speightstown

40 Speightstown

41 Speightstown

42 Speightstown

43 Speightstown (new route coming soon)

44 Speightstown

50 Bridgetown via Spring Garden

51 Bridgetown Shuttle

54 Oistins via ABC Highway

54C Airport via Coverley

55 Wellhouse via Six Roads

56 University Hill/Airport via Warrens/Kingsland

57 Bridgetown via Tudor Bridge/Bank Hall/Garrison

58 Six Roads via St. George Church

59 Speightstown via Holetown

60 Bridgefield via Green Hill

References

External links

The Transport Board of Barbados - Official website
About the Barbados Transport Board
RAIL ROLE?

Transport in Barbados
Government agencies of Barbados
Government-owned companies of Barbados